Eka Kurniawan (born November 28, 1975) is an Indonesian writer and screenwriter.

In 2016, Kurniawan became the first Indonesian writer to be nominated for the Man Booker International Prize.

Early life 
He was born in Tasikmalaya, West Java, and grew up in a small coastal town Pangandaran. He studied philosophy at Gadjah Mada University, Yogyakarta. Kurniawan currently lives in Jakarta. He writes novels, short stories, movie scripts, and blog, as well as essays. His works are translated into more than 24 languages.

Career 
His novel Beauty Is a Wound was included in the list of 100 notable books by The New York Times. The use of magic realism in the book has led to comparisons to Gabriel García Márquez. Kurniawan has insisted that Beauty Is a Wound is neither a historical novel nor a book about Indonesian history. Kurniawan's style of "approaching social concerns at an angle rather than head-on, with hefty doses of surrealism and wry humour" also draws comparisons to Haruki Murakami. He has been described as "Indonesia’s finest writer since Pramoedya Ananta Toer" and "Indonesia's most exciting author."

In 2016, Palari Films announced a film adaptation of Kurniawan's book Vengeance Is Mine, All Others Pay Cash to be directed by Edwin, who will also co-write the screenplay with Kurniawan. The film is expected to get a 2021 release.

Personal life 
Kurniawan is married to fellow writer and screenwriter Ratih Kumala.

Bibliography

English

Filmography

Accolades

References

External links
Eka Kurniawan Journal
Gramedia Pustaka Utama

1975 births
Living people
Indonesian male novelists
Indonesian male writers
People from Tasikmalaya
21st-century male writers